Greatest Hits is the first compilation album by American actor and country music artist John Schneider. It was released in 1987 via MCA Records.

Track listing

Chart performance

References

1987 compilation albums
John Schneider (screen actor) albums
Albums produced by Jimmy Bowen
MCA Records compilation albums